The University of Puerto Rico (UPR) is the main public university system in the U.S. Commonwealth of Puerto Rico. It is a government-owned corporation with 11 campuses and approximately 58,000 students and 5,300 faculty members. UPR has the largest and most diverse academic offerings in the commonwealth, with 472 academic programs of which 32 lead to a doctorate.

History 
In 1900, at Fajardo, the Escuela Normal Industrial (normal school) was established as the first higher education center in Puerto Rico. Its initial enrollment was 20 students and 5 professors. The following year it was moved to Río Piedras. On March 12, 1903, the legislature authorized founding of the University of Puerto Rico, and that day the "Escuela Normal" was proclaimed as its first department.

In 1908, the Morrill-Nelson Act was extended to Puerto Rico, making the university a "Land Grant College," which authorizes the use of federal land to establish colleges of agriculture, science and engineering. Two years later, in 1910, the College of Liberal Arts was established and the year following that the College of Agriculture at Mayagüez came into being. In 1912, the name was changed to College of Agriculture and Mechanic Arts.

1913 – The Departments of Pharmacy and Law were established.

1923 – The University Act of 1923– the university reorganized administratively it independent Insular Department of Education, provides the Board of Trustees as the governing board, and make the position of Rector as the principal officer. In 1924 the governor appointed the first Rector.

1924 – The administrative structure and identity of the University of Puerto Rico becomes independent from the Department of Public Instruction.

1926 – The School of Commerce (later School of Business Administration) and the School of Tropical Medicine were established.

1927 – Opening of the first graduate program: the Master of Arts in Hispanic Studies.

1928 – The San Felipe Segundo hurricane struck the island of Puerto Rico and caused serious damage in the Río Piedras campus. Staff and faculty began a reconstruction effort.

1935 – The U.S. Congress extended to Puerto Rico the benefits of Bankhead-Jones Act, which provided funding for research and the construction of more buildings.

1936–1939 – Major structures in Spanish Renaissance style are built in the quadrangle in Río Piedras, including buildings such as the Tower Theatre.

1938 – Augusto Rodríguez composed the music and lyrics Arriví Francisco's Alma Mater, the university anthem.

1942 – Act No. 135 of May 7, 1942, amendment to the university, created the Higher Education Council as the governing board of the institution and regulator of the higher education system in Puerto Rico.

1946 – The university received accreditation from the Middle States Association of Colleges and Schools.

1966 – Act No. 1 of 1966, restructuring the university. The system change to three campuses-Río Piedras, Mayagüez and Medical Sciences.

1967 – Creation of the regional colleges: Arecibo, Cayey and Humacao. Five more were created in the following years: Ponce (1969), Bayamón (1971), Aguadilla (1972), Carolina (1973), and Utuado (1978).

1979 – WRTU-FM began broadcasting from the Río Piedras campus.

1998 – Act No. 186 of August 7, 1998, provides for the gradual autonomy of regional schools as provided by the Board of Trustees, to lead to eleven autonomous units.

2010–2011 University of Puerto Rico strikes where a series of strikes which occurred as a result of administrative budget cuts and an attempt to impose an $800 quota for students.

July 2010, the Middle States Commission on Higher Education placed the accreditation of the university on probation citing concerns about shortfalls in the governance of the institution. By the end of 2011, all 11 campuses had regained full accreditation after demonstrating significant progress in this area.

2017 – The UPR's staff organized a strike in opposition to budget cuts proposed by the Financial Oversight and Management Board for Puerto Rico.

After the impact of Hurricane Maria the university suffered damages totaling over $175 million. The university system was still in the process of acquiring FEMA funding to repair damages and as a result still suffered from structural damage months after the hurricane. The hurricane also affected the process of accreditation since eight campuses where in non compliance according to of the Middle States Commission on Higher Education. The eleven campuses opened within two months of Hurricane Maria, offering a sense of structure and normalcy for professors and students.

2019– During Jorge Haddock tenure the university newspaper, Diálogo, after 32 years in print, was moved online and employees were laid off until only the editor and an assistant remained. They were reassigned, while the newspaper was moved from the central administration to the Arecibo campus.

2021 – In June the Financial Oversight and Management Board cut $94 million from the UPR budget which would have drastically affected the institutions ability to operate. The local government intervened and assigned the money necessary before the August semester commenced.

Organization

Board of Trustees
The board of trustees is the governing body of the University of Puerto Rico.

On April 30, 2013, governor Alejandro García Padilla signed into law Act 13 of 2014 enacted by the 17th Legislative Assembly. The act effectively replaced the incumbent board with an entirely new board. In 2017 the board was changed once again by governor Ricardo Rosselló.

Campuses

Presidents

Campus radio
The campus radio station is called "WRTU Radio Universidad de Puerto Rico", and it was established in 1980. This is a public radio station with diverse musical and news programming. Its broadcasts both in FM and online.

Admissions
UPR has the highest selectivity index of all colleges and universities in Puerto Rico, it has also maintained a systemwide admission rate of 67% since 1997. Its enrollment rate has surpassed 90% during the past five academic years. In terms of tuition, the cost per credit is $145 per undergraduate credit and $300 per graduate credit. The cost of undergraduate credit is expected to rise until reaching $169 in 2026.

Research
The university has a classification of "R2: Doctoral Universities – High research activity".

On October 15, 2010, it was awarded over $25 million from the National Science Foundation (NSF) to support research in nanotechnology. The organization within the University of Puerto Rico impacted is called Puerto Rico EPSCoR (Experimental Program to Stimulate Competitive Research). Since its creation 24 years ago, Puerto Rico EPSCoR has received over $180 million from NSF, NASA, the U.S. Department of Energy, and the U.S. Department of Defense.

On August 24, 2020, the university announced ten investigations for preventing and mitigating the spread of COVID-19 as part of $1.7 million the institution received from the local government.

Rankings and notable facts

According to the QS world ranking 2022 published in 2021, the University of Puerto Rico ranks number 40 in Latin America having dropped from 37 in 2020, but still higher than previous rankings of 42 in 2018 and 62 in 2015.

As a system, the University of Puerto Rico placed in the 800–1000 bracket in the 2018 edition of QS World University Rankings. Times Higher Education also ranks it in the 801–1000 bracket in the world. UPR was ranked among the best 20 universities in Latin America by SCImago ranking in 2010. The University of Puerto Rico ranked 18th and University of Puerto Rico at Mayagüez ranked 78th by Webometrics in Latin America. The UPR is the number one university in the Caribbean according to Webometrics.

The system's only school of engineering at the Mayagüez campus is accredited by ABET and graduates more than 600 engineers per year. The school was chosen as the top engineering school for Hispanics by Hispanic Engineer & Information Technology Magazine.

In 2020 the director of NASA grant consortium in Puerto Rico doctor Gerardo Moller, stated that 25% of the Hispanic employees hired by NASA are graduates of the UPR.

Research activity, measured in terms of external funds received, has grown exponentially since 1985, doubling every five years. In 2007–2008 the UPR received over $87 million for research.

Notable alumni

See also

 School of Tropical Medicine
 2010 University of Puerto Rico Strike

Notes

References

External links
  Official website

 
Puerto Rico
Educational institutions established in 1903
1903 establishments in Puerto Rico
Public university systems in the United States